Tol Siah or Tall-e Siah or Tall Siah or Tol-e Siah or Tol Seyah or Tall-e Siyah or Tal-e Siyah may refer to:
 Tol Siah, Bushehr
 Tall Siah, Fars
 Tall-e Siah, Hormozgan
 Tall Siah, Kerman
 Tall-e Siah, Kohgiluyeh and Boyer-Ahmad
 Tal-e Siyah, Charam, Kohgiluyeh and Boyer-Ahmad Province